The Ben of Howth (Irish: Beann Éadair ) is a hilly area on Howth Head, adjacent to the 171 metre high Black Linn, the peninsula's highest point.

Geography 
Lying approximately 1½ km to the south of Howth village, the nearest road is Windgate Road, from which a path leads west past Green Hollows quarry.

Two of Howth's other peaks are nearby, Shelmartin or Shielmartin which lies approximately 1 km to the west, and Dun Hill, 0.5 km to the north west.

Gallery

References and notes

Howth
Marilyns of Ireland
Mountains and hills of Fingal